John E. Tapscott (January 23, 1930 – August 16, 2017) was an American politician in the state of Iowa.

Tapscott was born in Des Moines, Iowa. He attended the American Institute of Business and was an insurance agent and an advertising director. He served in the Iowa State Senate from 1971 to 1973, and the Iowa House of Representatives from 1967 to 1971 as a Democrat. He died in 2017 at the age of 87.

References

1930 births
2017 deaths
Politicians from Des Moines, Iowa
Businesspeople from Des Moines, Iowa
Democratic Party Iowa state senators
Democratic Party members of the Iowa House of Representatives
20th-century American businesspeople